Hypostrymon is a Nearctic and Neotropical genus of butterflies in the family Lycaenidae.

Species
Hypostrymon critola (Hewitson, 1874) – Sonoran hairstreak
Hypostrymon renidens (Draudt, 1920)
Hypostrymon aepeona (Draudt, 1920)
Hypostrymon asa (Hewitson, 1868)

References

Eumaeini
Lycaenidae of South America
Lycaenidae genera